Gambetta is a station of the Paris Métro. It serves Line 3 and is the southern terminus of Line 3bis. Its located in the 20th arrondissement of Paris.

Location
The station is located under Avenue Gambetta, the platforms are position:

 on line 3, between Place Gambetta and Place Martin-Nadaud on an east–west axis (between Père Lachaise and Porte de Bagnolet stations);
 on line 3 bis, north-east of the square, along the town hall of the 20th arrondissement along a north-east / south-west axis (preceded by Pelleport).

History
 It was opened on 25 January 1905 when the line was extended from Père Lachaise and was the eastern terminus of the line until 27 November 1921, when the line was extended to Porte des Lilas.

In 1969, the former Martin Nadaud station, which was only 232 metres west of Gambetta, was combined with Gambetta by linking Martin Nadaud's closed platforms with Gambetta by tunnel. On 23 March 1971 the line to Porte des Lilas was separated from line 3 and became Line 3bis. The beginning of the old tunnel to Porte des Lilas now connects the platforms of lines 3 and 3bis. On 2 April 1971 line 3 was extended to Gallieni.

As part of the RATP Renouveau du métro program, the station was renovated by reconnecting with the classic bevelled white tiles, first in corridors by 6 February 2004, then on the platforms of line 3 by 5 November 2008.

The station is in the Avenue Gambetta, which is named after the statesman Léon Gambetta (1838–82), Prime Minister for 66 days in 1881 and 1882.

In 2018, 7,137,504 passengers entered this station which placed it at the 41st position of the metro stations for its usage.

Passenger services

Access
 Entrance: 20th arrondissement town hall, Rue Belgrand, hôpital Tenon
 Entrance: corner of Avenue du Père-Lachaise and Rue des Pyrénées
 Entrance: Avenue Gambetta, Rue des Pyrénées
 Entrance: Place Martin-Nadaud, Rue Orfila
 Entrance: Place Martin-Nadaud, Avenue Gambetta

Station layout

Platforms
Line 3 station is standard configuration with two platforms separated by metro tracks under an elliptical vault. On the other hand, the stopping point is of an unusual length, because its western end, established in a slight curve, consists of the platforms of the former Martin Nadaud station, absorbed in 1969, their border is now fitted with railings. A clear difference in height is also visible between the two parts of the vault. Following the modernization of the station completed in 2008, the new stop point on line 3 is provided with specific lighting, provided by four-branched candelabras diffusing white light on the platforms and bluish on the painted white vault. The lighting of the Martin Nadaud station is carried out by tubes that are usually found in certain corridors of renovated stations. The bevelled white ceramic tiles cover the walls and part of the tunnel exits. The advertising frames are in white ceramic and the name of the station is written in Parisine font on enamelled plates. The Akiko style seats are green.

The station on line 3 bis, the former departure station for the terminus loop, consists of two tracks on either side of a central platform under an elliptical vault, with a dead-end buffer stop on the south side. Established in a curve, it is completely covered with bevelled white tiles and devoid of advertising frames on its sides; the enamelled name plates in Parisine font are only present on the island platform. The latter is fitted with red Motte style seats and lit by a tube strip.

Bus connections
The station is served by lines 26, 60, 61, 64, 69, 102 and the La Traverse de Charonne urban service of the RATP Bus Network and, by night, by lines N16 and N34 of the Noctilien network.

Nearby
 Père Lachaise Cemetery
 Hôpital Tenon
 Mairie du 20e arrondissement
 Théâtre national de la Colline

Gallery

References

Roland, Gérard (2003). Stations de métro. D’Abbesses à Wagram. Éditions Bonneton.

Paris Métro stations in the 20th arrondissement of Paris
Railway stations in France opened in 1905